Andrew Donald DeClercq (born February 1, 1973) is an American retired professional basketball player and current coach. He was a center and power forward in the National Basketball Association (NBA) for ten seasons during the 1990s and 2000s.  DeClercq played college basketball for the University of Florida, and thereafter, he played professionally for the Golden State Warriors, Boston Celtics, Cleveland Cavaliers, and Orlando Magic of the NBA.

Born in Detroit, Michigan, in 1973, DeClercq accepted an athletic scholarship to attend the University of Florida in Gainesville, Florida, where he played center for coach Lon Kruger's Florida Gators men's basketball team from 1991 to 1995.  He was a key starter for the Gators in the run to their first NCAA Final Four appearance in 1994.  DeClercq graduated from Florida with a bachelor's degree in history in 1995.

The Golden State Warriors selected DeClercq in the second round (thirty-fourth pick overall) in the 1995 NBA Draft, and he played for the Warriors for the following two seasons.  He went on to play for the Boston Celtics, the Cleveland Cavaliers and Orlando Magic, averaging 4.8 points and 4.2 rebounds per game.

After retiring from the NBA, DeClerq was an assistant coach for the nationally ranked Montverde Academy boys' basketball team under head coach Kevin Sutton. In 2010, he became the head coach of the boys' varsity team and a physical education teacher at Foundation Academy.

Until 2014, he owned and operated DeClercq Basketball which runs youth basketball day camps, training and clinics in central Florida.

DeClercq lives in Clermont, Florida, where, as of 2017, he is the executive pastor of HighPoint Church in Ocoee, Florida.

See also

 List of Florida Gators in the NBA
 List of University of Florida alumni

References

External links 
 NBA.com profile

1973 births
Living people
American men's basketball players
Basketball coaches from Florida
Basketball coaches from Michigan
Basketball players from Detroit
Basketball players from Florida
Boston Celtics players
Centers (basketball)
Cleveland Cavaliers players
Competitors at the 1994 Goodwill Games
Florida Gators men's basketball players
Golden State Warriors draft picks
Golden State Warriors players
Goodwill Games medalists in basketball
High school basketball coaches in Florida
Orlando Magic players
People from Clermont, Florida
Power forwards (basketball)
Sportspeople from Lake County, Florida